The Lepallier River is a tributary of the south shore of the Broadback River flowing westward to Rupert Bay, located south of the James Bay. The Lepallier River flows in the municipalities of Eeyou Istchee Baie-James (municipality) and Waskaganish (Cree village municipality), in the administrative region of Nord-du-Québec, in Quebec, in Canada.

Geography 
The hydrographic slopes near the Lepallier River are:
 north side: Broadback River;
 east side: Machisipi River, Natouacamisie River;
 south side: Nottaway River;
 west side: Nottaway River, Rupert Bay.

The Lepallier River flows northwest between the Nottaway (located to the south) and the Broadback River (located to the north).

Its mouth flows to the south bank of the Broadback River, southeast of the Cree

The Lepallier River is accessible from the Rodayer Lake campground, near the "James Bay Road". The Lepallier River is accessible from the Rodayer Lake Campground, near the "James Bay Road".

Toponymy
The old name of this watercourse was "Coussinet river".

The toponym "Lepallier River" was formalized on December 5, 1968, at the Commission de toponymie du Québec.

See also

References 

Rivers of Nord-du-Québec
Eeyou Istchee James Bay
Broadback River drainage basin